Vietnam competed at the 2018 Asian Games in Jakarta and Palembang, Indonesia from 18 August to 2 September 2018. The country surpassed its target of winning 3 gold medals at the Games by concluding the competition with 5 gold medals, 15 silver medals, and 19 bronze medals, ranking 16th out of 46 participating members of the Olympic Council of Asia.

Medalists

The following Vietnam competitors won medals at the Games.

|  style="text-align:left; width:78%; vertical-align:top;"|

|  style="text-align:left; width:22%; vertical-align:top;"|

Competitors 
The following is a list of the number of competitors representing Vietnam that participated at the Games:

Archery 

Recurve

Compound

Athletics

Twenty-two Vietnamese athletes competed in athletics events at the 2018 Asian Games, winning a total of 5 medals including 1 gold medal in women's long jump, 1 silver medal in women's 400m hurdles, and 3 bronze medals in women's 3000m steeplechase, women's triple jump and women's  relay.

Men's events

Women's events

Mixed events

Badminton

Basketball 3 x 3

Men

Roster

Pool A

Women

Pool A

Bowling

Men

Boxing

Men

Women

Canoeing

Sprint

Qualification legend: QF=Final; QS=Semifinal

Cycling

Mountain biking

Road
Men

Women

Fencing 

Individual

Team

Football 

Vietnam men's football team were drawn in group D, while the women's team in group C.

Summary

Men's tournament

Roster

Group D

Round of 16

Quarter-final

Semi-final

Bronze medal match

Women's tournament

Roster

Group C

Quarter-final

Golf

Men

Women

Gymnastics

Jujitsu

Judo 

Vietnam will participate in judo at the Games with 7 judokas (2 men's and 5 women's).

Men

Women

Karate

Men

Women

Kurash

Men

Women

Pencak silat

Seni events
Men

Women

Tanding events
Men

Women

Rowing

Men

Women

Sambo

Sepak takraw

Men

Women

Shooting

Men

Women

Mixed

Soft tennis

Swimming

Men's events

Women's events

Table tennis 

Individual

Team

Taekwondo

Poomsae

Kyorugi

Tennis 

Men

Women

Mixed

Volleyball 

The Volleyball Federation of Vietnam (VFV) sent the men's team who competed in pool E and the women's team in pool B at the Games. VFV also entered 4 beach volleyball pairs at the Games.

Beach volleyball

Indoor volleyball

Men's tournament

Team roster
The following is the Vietnam roster in the men's volleyball tournament of the 2018 Asian Games.

Head coach: Phùng Công Hưng

Pool E

13th–20th quarterfinal

13th–16th semifinal

13th place game

Women's tournament

Team roster
The following is the Vietnamese roster in the women's volleyball tournament of the 2018 Asian Games.

Head coach: Nguyễn Tuấn Kiệt

Pool B

Quarterfinal

5–8th place semifinal

5th place game

Weightlifting

Men

Women

Wrestling 

Vietnam entered the competition with 9 wrestlers (4 men's and 5 women's). Until the end of the competition, the athletes closed the Games with winning one bronze medal. The best achievement reached by Nguyễn Thị Mỹ Hạnh after placing in the third position.

Men's freestyle

Men's Greco-Roman

Women's freestyle

Wushu 

Taolu

Sanda

Key: * TV – Technical victory.

See also 

 Vietnam at the 2018 Asian Para Games

References

External links 
 VIETNAM at Olympic Council of Asia

Nations at the 2018 Asian Games
2018
Asian Games